The 1921 Michigan Agricultural Aggies football team represented Michigan Agricultural College (MAC) as an independent during the 1921 college football season. In their first year under head coach Albert Barron, the Aggies compiled a 3–5 record and were outscored by their opponents 126 to 68.

Schedule

Game summaries

Michigan

On October 15, 1921, the Aggies lost to Michigan by a 30–0 score. The game was played at Ferry Field before a crowd of 18,000 spectators. Michigan halfback Harry Kipke, who would later coach the Aggies in 1928, scored three touchdowns, including one on a punt return from midfield, and kicked nine punts for an average of better than 42 yards. Michigan's passing games was called "nothing short of miserable" as five of the Wolverines' passes were intercepted and only one was completed. Michigan's defense held the Aggies to 57 yards of total offense and two first downs (one of which was achieved by an offside penalty against Michigan). The game was played in 15-minute quarters at Ferry Field in Ann Arbor.

References

Michigan Agricultural
Michigan State Spartans football seasons
Michigan Agricultural Aggies football